Diego José Clementino (born 18 March 1984 in São Paulo), or simply Diego Clementino, is a Brazilian striker. He currently plays for Rio Verde.

Club career

He joined Saba in December 2009.

Honours
Campeonato Brasileiro Série A: 2003
Copa do Brasil: 2003
Campeonato Mineiro: 2003, 2006

External links
sportsya 
globoesporte 

1984 births
Living people
Brazilian footballers
Cruzeiro Esporte Clube players
C.D. Nacional players
Paulista Futebol Clube players
Associação Desportiva Cabofriense players
Botafogo de Futebol e Regatas players
Expatriate footballers in Iran
Saba players
América Futebol Clube (MG) players
Grêmio Foot-Ball Porto Alegrense players
Red Bull Brasil players
ABC Futebol Clube players
Association football forwards
Footballers from São Paulo